"Scatterlings of Africa" is a 1982 song by the South African band Juluka, first released on their 1982 album Scatterlings. It was re-released in 1987 by Juluka's successor band Savuka on Third World Child. The song was a commercial success, charting in France and the United Kingdom. Its lyrics explore the "myriad dislocations" experienced by South Africa. The rousing and upbeat music incorporated Zulu influences. The song introduced the music of Johnny Clegg, the cofounder of Juluka and Savuka, to Western audiences.

Background and composition

Juluka (meaning "sweat" in Zulu) was founded in 1969 by Johnny Clegg and Sipho Mchunu. They mixed Zulu music with influences from rock and Celtic music. As a multiracial band in apartheid-era South Africa, Juluka frequently had trouble with the police, and their songs were banned by state-run radio stations, but their brand of Afro-pop nonetheless became popular.

The song's lyrics have been described as "reflecting the myriad dislocations of South African society." According to scholar Timothy Taylor, they describe the story of "the hungry, the searching, all trying to make a better South Africa". The song's chorus illustrated its themes, also present in other compositions by Clegg: "They are the scatterlings of Africa/Each uprooted one/On the road to Phelamanga/Where the world began/I love the scatterlings of Africa/Each and every one/In their hearts a burning hunger/Beneath the copper sun."

Although "Scatterlings of Africa" uses rousing and upbeat music, it contains musical elements that reflect the themes of the lyrics, including the use of 7/4 meter, denying the listener a regular downbeat. The song's introduction is played in a  4/4 meter. The song switches between major and minor keys, a device which, according to scholar Timothy Taylor, reflects its rejection of fixed views of identity and social position. It thus implies  that "Everyone is a scatterling, everyone is displaced by apartheid, [everyone] is left without a stable home or identity." 

As with other songs by Juluka, "Scatterlings of Africa" is influenced by Zulu "ngoma" dance and associated music, as seen in the repeated cycle of vocables, typically rendered as "Ji oyi hmm, oyi hmm hmm" in the introduction. The phrase is sung with prominent bass and a heavy beat. In the later portion of the song, the same phrase creates a counterpoint with the phrase "O lala, o lala", sung at a high pitch by Clegg. In a 1987 cover by Savuka, founded by Clegg after Juluka disbanded, the bass drums are enhanced in volume, creating an exceptionally resonant sound. The original version of the song was somewhat shorter than five minutes; Savuka's version also removed a verse, and was thus approximately a minute shorter.

Release and reception
"Scatterlings of Africa" was released in 1982 as the first track of Juluka's fourth album, Scatterlings. It was released again in 1987 by Savuka, on their album Third World Child. The song exposed Clegg's music to Western audiences, and became a staple of his live performances, and a mainstay on compilations of his songs. Fans on the internet often referred to themselves as "Scatterlings". The track was a top-50 hit in the U.K, while Savuka's version charted in France and other countries. The original 1982 version of the song peaked at No. 106 on the Billboard Bubbling Under Hot 100 Charts in June 1983. Its success allowed Clegg to leave his academic position as an anthropologist at the University of the Witwatersrand, to become a full-time musician. A remixed version was used on the soundtrack of the 1988 film Rain Man.

References

1982 songs
1987 songs
Savuka songs
Juluka songs
South African songs